Ubiquinol-cytochrome c reductase, Rieske iron-sulfur polypeptide 1, also known as UQCRFS1, Rieske iron-sulfur (Fe-S) protein, Cytochrome b-c1 complex subunit 5, or Complex III subunit 5 is a protein which in humans is encoded by the UQCRFS1 gene.

Structure 
UQCRFS1 is located on the q arm of chromosome 19 in position 12, has 2 exons, and spans 5,969 base pairs. The UQCRFS1 gene produces a 29.7 kDa protein composed of 274 amino acids. UQCRFS1 is a subunit of the respiratory chain protein Ubiquinol Cytochrome c Reductase (UQCR, Complex III or Cytochrome bc1 complex). The structure of the complex is a symmetric homodimer composed of one mitochondrial genome encoded cytochrome b subunit and ten other nucleus encoded subunits. The primary structure of UQCRFS1 from cDNA analysis is composed of a 78 amino acid long N-terminal extension sequence.

Function 
The UQCRFS1 gene encodes for an iron-sulfur protein, which is an essential subunit of the Ubiquinol Cytochrome c Reductase or Complex III in the mitochondrial respiratory chain. 
Complex III is responsible for electron transfer from coenzyme Q to cytochrome c as well as the proton transfer from the extracellular matrix to the intermembrane space which leads to ATP-coupled electrochemical potential generation. Incorporation of the subunit UQCRFS1 is the second to last step in complex III assembly. Once it is incorporated, UQCRFS1 undergoes proteolytic processing, which is essential for the correct insertion into Complex III. Preventions of the insertion may occur due to UQCRFS1-derived fragments, leading to a loss of Complex III structure and function.

Clinical significance
The UQCRFS1 gene has been shown to be involved in carcinogenesis of some cancers. It is mainly associated with more aggressive tumors, and results in the development of more aggressive phenotypes of breast cancers. The association was found with a grade 3 amplification of the UQCRFS1 gene. In addition, Acute myeloid leukemia (AML) has been found to be associated with the amplification of UQCRFS1 gene. In contrast, UQCRFS1 and complex III has been absent in renal cell carcinoma, though the mechanism is unknown.

Interactions 

In addition to co-complexes, UQCRFS1 has protein-protein interactions with UQCRB, BCS1L, COX6B1, UQCRQ, NDUFA9, and other proteins.

References

Further reading